Laila al-Ouhaydib (Arabic: ليلى الأحيدب) is a Saudi Arabian short story writer and novelist. Her debut collection of short stories came out in 1997. Her stories have appeared in English translation in Banipal magazine and in Beyond the Dunes (2006), an anthology of contemporary Saudi literature. More recently, in 2009, she published her first novel under the title The Eyes of Foxes (عيون الثعالب).

References

Saudi Arabian novelists
Saudi Arabian short story writers
Living people
Year of birth missing (living people)
Women novelists
21st-century Saudi Arabian writers
21st-century Saudi Arabian women writers